Tulare Western High School is a public high school in Tulare, California, United States.  Tulare Western's current enrollment is close to  2,100, making it the largest of the three Tulare high schools. The school is part of the Tulare Joint Union High School District, along with Tulare Union High School and Mission Oak High School, headquartered in Tulare, with Lucy Van Scyoc as District Superintendent.

Tulare Western was established in 1959. Its new principal is Tou Lor, who replaced Sara Morton. Campus capacity for students is about 2,100. Before the opening of Tulare's newest high school (Mission Oak high school), Western's enrollment was as high as 2,700.

School colors are red, white and navy blue. The school's mascot is the Mustangs. Its athletic teams compete in the six-team West Yosemite League, and their rivals are the Tulare Union Tribe and the Mission Oak Hawks.

Varsity Football Records

References               
 
http://www.maxpreps.com/high-schools/tulare-western-mustangs-(tulare,ca)/football-fall-14/schedule.htm

Buildings and structures in Tulare, California
High schools in Tulare County, California
Public high schools in California
1959 establishments in California